Phyllonorycter uchidai is a moth of the family Gracillariidae. It is known from Hokkaido island of Japan.

The wingspan is 6–7 mm.

The larvae feed as leaf miners on Sorbus alnifolia. The mine is ptychonomous and located on the upper surface of the leaf.

References

uchidai
Moths of Japan

Leaf miners
Moths described in 1963
Taxa named by Tosio Kumata